Akitoshi Tamura (born May 31, 1980) is a Japanese mixed martial artist. He competed almost exclusively in the Shooto organization, before making his debut in 2008 at the WEC 37. In 2007, he was the lightweight champion of Shooto. He was once ranked as the #5 Bantamweight in the world by the MMAWeekly Worldwide Ranking System. Tamura is a freestyle fighter.

In 2004, Tamura became the first foreigner to beat a Burmese Lethwei fighter in an official match.

Mixed martial arts career
Tamura made his professional debut in the Shooto organization in a fight against Eiji Murayama, in August 2001, and lost on a technical decision (he later returned to face Murayama in 2004, only for the match to end in a draw). He has made MMA headlines when he defeated Takeshi Inoue in 2007, which won him the title of Shooto lightweight champion. He has also participated in GCM and MARS events, achieving a TKO over Masaomi Saito in the former, and a first round submission over Ian Loveland in the latter.

Akitoshi Tamura made his WEC debut at WEC 37. Although Akitoshi had a reputation of being one of the world's best in his weight class, he lost to former IFL featherweight champion Wagnney Fabiano, for whom it was also his WEC debut. For his next fight, Tamura made his 135 lb. debut in the bantamweight division at WEC 40 against former world title challenger Manny Tapia. Tamura defeated Tapia by unanimous decision. 

On October 10, 2009, he was scheduled to fight Damacio Page at WEC 43, but pulled out with an undisclosed injury.  He was replaced in the bout by WEC newcomer Will Campuzano.

On January 10, 2010, Tamura was defeated by WEC veteran Charlie Valencia via split decision at WEC 46.

Lethwei 
Tamura competed in a Lethwei tournament on July 10 & 11, 2004 at the Thuwunna National Indoor Stadium in Yangon, Myanmar against Aye Bo Sein. The event also showcased three other Japanese fighters, Tamura, Yoshitaro Niimi, Takaharu Yamamoto and Seiji Wakasugi against Burmese fighters. The other Burmese fighters competing in the tournament were Naing Wan Lay, Win Tun and Shwe Sai. 

Tamura knocked out local fighter Aya Bo Sein in the fourth round becoming the first foreigner to beat a Lethwei practitioner in an official match and received a challenge fight belt that was created specifically for the event.

Lethwei record 

|- style="background:#cfc;" 
| Jul 10, 2004 || Win || align="left" | Aye Bo Sein || Myanmar vs. Japan Lethwei Challenge Fights || Yangon, Myanmar|| KO || 4
|-
| colspan=9 | Legend:

Mixed martial arts record

|-
| Win
| align=center| 19–16–2
| Satoshi Inaba
| Decision (split)
| Pancrase: 267
| 
| align=center| 3
| align=center| 5:00
| Tokyo, Japan
|
|-
| Loss
| align=center| 18–16–2
| Guy Delumeau
| Decision (split)
| Pancrase: 264
| 
| align=center| 3
| align=center| 5:00
| Tokyo, Japan
|
|-
| Loss
| align=center| 18–15–2
| Andy Main
| TKO (punches)
| Pancrase: 262
| 
| align=center| 2
| align=center| 4:34
| Tokyo, Japan
|
|-
| Win
| align=center| 18–14–2
| Motoshi Miyaji 
| Decision (unanimous)
| Pancrase: 258
| 
| align=center| 3
| align=center| 5:00
| Tokyo, Japan
|
|-
| Win
| align=center| 17–14–2
| Brian Choi
| Decision (majority)
| Shooto: 4th Round 2013
| 
| align=center| 3
| align=center| 5:00
| Tokyo, Japan
|
|-
| Loss
| align=center| 16–14–2
| Yoshifumi Nakamura
| Decision (unanimous)
| Shooto: Gig Tokyo 14
| 
| align=center| 3
| align=center| 5:00
| Tokyo, Japan
|
|-
| Loss
| align=center| 16–13–2
| Yusuke Yachi
| Decision (unanimous)
| Shooto: 8th Round
| 
| align=center| 3
| align=center| 5:00
| Tokyo, Japan
|
|-
| Loss
| align=center| 16–12–2
| Yuji Hoshino 
| Decision (unanimous)
| Shooto: 3rd Round
| 
| align=center| 3
| align=center| 5:00
| Tokyo, Japan
|
|-
| Win
| align=center| 16–11–2
| Shigeki Osawa
| Decision (unanimous)
| Shooto: Shooto the Shoot 2011
| 
| align=center| 3
| align=center| 5:00
| Tokyo, Japan
| 
|-
| Loss
| align=center| 15–11–2
| Tetsu Suzuki
| Submission (triangle kimura)
| Shooto: Shootor's Legacy 3
| 
| align=center| 3
| align=center| 2:45
| Tokyo, Japan
| 
|-
| Loss
| align=center| 15–10–2
| Taiyo Nakahara
| DQ (low blows)
| World Victory Road Presents: Soul of Fight
| 
| align=center| 1
| align=center| 2:07
| Tokyo, Japan
| 
|-
| Win
| align=center| 15–9–2
| Shoko Sato
| Decision (split)
| World Victory Road Presents: Sengoku Raiden Championships 15
| 
| align=center| 2
| align=center| 5:00
| Tokyo, Japan
| 
|-
| Loss
| align=center| 14–9–2
| Masakatsu Ueda
| Decision (unanimous)
| Shooto: The Way of Shooto 3: Like a Tiger, Like a Dragon
| 
| align=center| 3
| align=center| 5:00
| Tokyo, Japan
| 
|-
| Loss
| align=center| 14–8–2
| Charlie Valencia
| Decision (split)
| WEC 46
| 
| align=center| 3
| align=center| 5:00
| Sacramento, California, USA
| 
|-
| Win
| align=center| 14–7–2
| Manny Tapia
| Decision (unanimous)
| WEC 40
| 
| align=center| 3
| align=center| 5:00
| Chicago, Illinois, USA
| 
|-
| Loss
| align=center| 13–7–2
| Wagnney Fabiano
| Submission (arm-triangle choke)
| WEC 37: Torres vs. Tapia
| 
| align=center| 3
| align=center| 4:48
| Las Vegas, Nevada, USA
| 
|-
| Win
| align=center| 13–6–2
| Rumina Sato
| Submission (north-south choke)
| Shooto: Shooto Tradition 1
| 
| align=center| 3
| align=center| 2:37
| Tokyo, Japan
| 
|-
| Loss
| align=center| 12–6–2
| Hideki Kadowaki
| Decision (majority)
| Shooto: Back To Our Roots 8
| 
| align=center| 3
| align=center| 5:00
| Tokyo, Japan
| 
|-
| Win
| align=center| 12–5–2
| Takeshi Inoue
| Decision (unanimous)
| Shooto: Back To Our Roots 3
| 
| align=center| 3
| align=center| 5:00
| Tokyo, Japan
| 
|-
| Win
| align=center| 11–5–2
| Tenkei Oda
| Decision (unanimous)
| Shooto: Back To Our Roots 1
| 
| align=center| 3
| align=center| 5:00
| Yokohama, Japan
| 
|-
| Win
| align=center| 10–5–2
| Akiyo Nishiura
| Decision (unanimous)
| Shooto: Rookie Tournament Final
| 
| align=center| 2
| align=center| 5:00
| Tokyo, Japan
| 
|-
| Win
| align=center| 9–5–2
| Sakae Kasuya
| Submission (armbar)
| Shooto 2006: 9/8 in Korakuen Hall
| 
| align=center| 1
| align=center| 2:16
| Tokyo, Japan
| 
|-
| Loss
| align=center| 8–5–2
| Tenkei Oda
| KO (punch)
| Shooto: The Devilock
| 
| align=center| 1
| align=center| 2:10
| Tokyo, Japan
| 
|-
| Win
| align=center| 8–4–2
| Masaomi Saito
| TKO (knees)
| GCM: D.O.G. 5
| 
| align=center| 1
| align=center| 1:02
| Tokyo, Japan
| 
|-
| Win
| align=center| 7–4–2
| Ian Loveland
| Submission (triangle choke)
| Martial Arts Reality Superfighting
| 
| align=center| 1
| align=center| 3:40
| Tokyo, Japan
| 
|-
| Loss
| align=center| 6–4–2
| Takeshi Inoue
| Decision (majority)
| Shooto 2005: 11/6 in Korakuen Hall
| 
| align=center| 3
| align=center| 5:00
| Tokyo, Japan
| 
|-
| Win
| align=center| 6–3–2
| Hayate Usui
| Technical Submission (rear-naked choke)
| Shooto: 9/23 in Korakuen Hall
| 
| align=center| 2
| align=center| 4:51
| Tokyo, Japan
| 
|-
| Win
| align=center| 5–3–2
| Fanjin Son
| Decision (majority)
| Shooto 2005: 7/30 in Korakuen Hall
| 
| align=center| 2
| align=center| 5:00
| Tokyo, Japan
| 
|-
| Loss
| align=center| 4–3–2
| Hideki Kadowaki
| Decision (unanimous)
| Shooto: 3/11 in Korakuen Hall
| 
| align=center| 2
| align=center| 5:00
| Tokyo, Japan
| 
|-
| Win
| align=center| 4–2–2
| Guseyn Aliev
| Submission (armbar)
| WAFC: Pankration Open Cup 2004
| 
| align=center| 1
| align=center| 1:53
| Khabarovsk, Russia
| 
|-
| Draw
| align=center| 3–2–2
| Eiji Murayama
| Draw
| Shooto: 3/22 in Korakuen Hall
| 
| align=center| 2
| align=center| 5:00
| Tokyo, Japan
| 
|-
| Win
| align=center| 3–2–1
| Yohei Nanbu
| Decision (unanimous)
| Shooto: Wanna Shooto 2003
| 
| align=center| 2
| align=center| 5:00
| Tokyo, Japan
| 
|-
| Win
| align=center| 2–2–1
| Masatoshi Kobayashi
| Decision (unanimous)
| Shooto: 3/18 in Korakuen Hall
| 
| align=center| 2
| align=center| 5:00
| Tokyo, Japan
| 
|-
| Loss
| align=center| 1–2–1
| Hiroshi Komatsu
| Technical Decision (unanimous) 
| Shooto: Gig East 10
| 
| align=center| 2
| align=center| 0:33
| Tokyo, Japan
| 
|-
| Draw
| align=center| 1–1–1
| Jin Kazeta
| Draw
| Shooto: Treasure Hunt 2
| 
| align=center| 2
| align=center| 5:00
| Tokyo, Japan
| 
|-
| Win
| align=center| 1–1–0
| Koichi Tanaka
| Decision (unanimous)
| Shooto: GIG East 5
| 
| align=center| 2
| align=center| 5:00
| Tokyo, Japan
| 
|-
| Loss
| align=center| 0–1–0
| Eiji Murayama
| Technical Decision (unanimous)
| Shooto: Wanna Shooto 2001
| 
| align=center| 2
| align=center| N/A
| Tokyo, Japan
|

References

External links
 
 
 
 

Living people
Japanese male mixed martial artists
Bantamweight mixed martial artists
Mixed martial artists utilizing judo
Mixed martial artists utilizing Lethwei
Japanese Lethwei practitioners
Japanese male judoka
1980 births
Sportspeople from Hyōgo Prefecture
20th-century Japanese people
21st-century Japanese people